The Prussian House of Representatives was the lower chamber of the Landtag of Prussia, the parliament of Prussia from 1850 to 1918. Together with the upper house, the House of Lords, it formed the Prussian bicameral legislature. The Prussian House of Representatives was established by the Prussian constitution of 5 December 1848, with members elected according to the three-class franchise. At first it was called simply the "Second Chamber," with the name "House of Representatives" introduced in 1855.

Franchise

From 1849, the election of representatives within the Kingdom of Prussia was performed according to the three-class franchise system. The election was indirect. In the primary election, those with the right to vote went to the ballot and, in three separate classes, chose electors, who, in turn, chose the representatives for their constituency.

Several attempts to reform the voting procedure, which heavily favoured the Conservatives, were rebuffed by the House of Lords. The electoral law, which was one of the most progressive in Europe when it was introduced, thus stayed mostly unchanged until 1918. The House of Representatives itself decided to abolish it in 1918, but it had become redundant by the German Revolution of 1918–1919, which founded a republic.

The right to vote was open to every male Prussian over 24 years of age who had been living in a Prussian municipality for at least six months and had not been stripped of his rights by a court of law and was not in receipt of public pauper relief. To stand for election as a representative, one had to be over 30, be a Prussian for at least three years and not be stripped of civil rights by a court.

Legislative periods

The legislative period was at first three years, but, as for the Reichstag, it was changed to five years in 1888. The House was, however, dissolved by the king prematurely several times. From 1849 to 1918, there were 22 legislative periods.

Composition

Its size was first fixed at 350 seats, which changed to 352 with the incorporation of Hohenzollern-Sigmaringen and Hohenzollern-Hechingen in 1849. Following annexations after the Austro-Prussian War of 1866, the number of seats changed to 432 after the election of 1867. In 1876, another seat for the Duchy of Lauenburg was added. In 1906, ten seats were added, bringing the number to 443 for the elections of 1908.

The members of the House received monetary compensation for their work, unlike (until 1906) the members of the Reichstag. Therefore, many Reichstag members also sat in the House of Representatives. In 1903, 110 members of the Reichstag were likewise members of the Prussian House, that is, almost half of the House of Representatives' 236 seats. After 1906, the number of dual office-holders sank significantly, to only 45 in 1913.

From 1862, there was a clear liberal majority in the House. In the Prussian constitutional crisis of 1859–66, however, the Liberals were defeated by chancellor Otto von Bismarck. After the war of 1866, the National Liberals split from the Liberals, and the latter never regained their former strength.

The distribution of seats from 1867, at the beginning of the respective legislative period:

Notes: 1 Split from the conservatives; 2 Split from the National Liberals; 3 German Free-minded Party; 4 Progressive People's Party (Germany)

Presidents

Abolition
The House of Representatives was abolished on 15 November 1918 by the Prussian revolutionary cabinet, led by Social Democrats and Independent Social Democrats. The last sign of life of the House of Representatives was a protest held by its vice-president, Felix Porsch, on 24 November 1918.

Defunct lower houses
Politics of Prussia
1848 establishments in Prussia
1918 disestablishments in Germany